C. M. S. English Medium High School is a co-educational secondary school located at Sector no 1/28, Sambhaji Chowk, Nigdi, in Pune, India. The full form of C.M.S is Chinchwad Malayalam Samajam, although education is given in English language.

The school is recognised by the Government of the State of Maharashtra and prepares its students for the Secondary School Certificate Examination (SSC - Std. 10). Since the schools first batch of 10th std in 2006 school has shown consistent 100% results for five years (till 2010), while many students scored distinction in these five years.

See also 
List of schools in Pune

References

External links 
"Schools to tackle exam stress" on 3dsyndication.com

High schools and secondary schools in Maharashtra
Schools in Pune